The Hartford Bridge, or Blue Bridge, is a single-span road bridge crossing the River Weaver at Hartford, Cheshire in England. The bridge is located on the A556 as part of the Northwich bypass.

Bridges in Cheshire
Northwich
Bridges completed in 1938